Rogerio Silva is a Mozambican swimmer. He competed in the men's 100 metre breaststroke at the 1980 Summer Olympics.

References

External links
 

Year of birth missing (living people)
Living people
Mozambican male breaststroke swimmers
Olympic swimmers of Mozambique
Swimmers at the 1980 Summer Olympics
Place of birth missing (living people)